The Bayer designation Phi Hydrae (φ Hya / φ Hydrae) is shared by three star systems, in the constellation Hydra:
φ1, 43 Hydrae
φ2, 1 Crateris
φ3, 2 Crateris

The three stars form a triangle between the brighter μ Hydrae and ν Hydrae.

Hydrae, Phi
Hydra (constellation)